Tatjana Romanova-Vorontsova (until 1998 Romanova; Russian: Татьяна Романова-Воронцова; born on 5 July 1973 in Pomara, Mari El Republic) is a Russian soprano opera singer. 

In 2000 she graduated from Estonian Music Academy. From 1998 until 2001 she was a visiting soloist, and from 2001 until 2003 a soloist at Vanemuine Theatre in Estonia. Since 2003, she is working at Finnish National Opera.

Awards:
 2003: 2nd prize in Klaudia Taev Competition

Roles

 Gilda (Verdi, Rigoletto, 1998)
 Lucia (Donizetti, Lucia di Lammermoor, 1999)
 Leonora (Nielsen Maskarade, 1999)

References

Living people
1973 births
People from Mari El
Russian operatic sopranos